The Maybe Mahal Stakes raced as The Hong Kong Jockey Club Stakes (2021), is a registered Victoria Racing Club Group 3 Thoroughbred set weights with penalties horse race for mares, over a distance of 1400 metres held annually at Flemington Racecourse, Melbourne, Australia during the VRC Spring Racing Carnival on Melbourne Cup day.  Total prize money for the race is A$200,000.

History

The registered race is named after Maybe Mahal, 1977-1978 Australian Racehorse of the Year and trained by Bart Cummings.

Name
2005  - Liberty Financial Plate 
2006–2007  - Liberty Financial Stakes  
2008–2012  - Herald Sun Stakes    
2013 -  Lavazza Short Black  
2014–2018 - Hong Kong Jockey Club Stakes
2019 - Jim Beam Stakes
2020 - Hong Kong Jockey Club Stakes

Grade
 2005–2011 - Listed Race
 2012 onwards - Group 3

Winners

2022 - Larkspur Run 
2021 - Rich Hips 
2020 - Rich Hips 
2019 - Teleplay 
2018 - Cool Passion 
2017 - Pedrena
2016 - Artistry
2015 - Scarlet Billows
2014 - Mahara
2013 - Plucky Belle
2012 - Koonoomoo
2011 - Sophie's Spirit
2010 - Jersey Lily
2009 - Strawberry Field
2008 - Neroli
2007 - Juste Momente
2006 - Storm Signal
2005 - Vintner

See also
 List of Australian Group races
 Group races

References

Horse races in Australia